The Knox Falcons Baseball Club is a baseball club based in the outer Melbourne suburb of Knoxfield. The club's senior teams compete in the Melbourne Winter Baseball League and its juniors compete in the Ringwood District Baseball League.

History
The club was formed for the 1978 Ringwood District Baseball League winter season.

In 2012, the club made its return to A grade of the Melbourne Winter Baseball League. after playing 2 years in B grade.

Life members

*denotes deceased

References

External links
Official website

Australian baseball clubs
Baseball teams in Melbourne
Baseball teams established in 1978
1978 establishments in Australia
Sport in the City of Knox